Conus amadis, common name: the Amadis cone, is a species of predatory sea snail, a marine gastropod mollusk in the family Conidae, the cone snails or cones.

Like all species within the genus Conus, these snails are predatory and venomous. They are capable of "stinging" humans, therefore live ones should be handled carefully or not at all.

Description
The size of an adult shell varies between 40 mm and 110 mm. The spire is striate, channeled, concavely elevated, sharp-pointed. It has a sharp shoulder angle. The lower part of body whorl is punctured and grooved The color of the shell is orange-brown to chocolate, thickly covered
with large and small subtriangular white spots, which by their varied disposition sometimes form a white central band, or dark bands above and below the center, the latter occasionally bearing articulated revolving lines.

Distribution
This marine species occurs in the Mascarene Basin, in the Indian Ocean and in the Pacific Ocean along Indonesia, New Caledonia and Polynesia.

References

 Drivas, J. & M. Jay (1988). Coquillages de La Réunion et de l'île Maurice
 Filmer R.M. (2001). A Catalogue of Nomenclature and Taxonomy in the Living Conidae 1758 - 1998. Backhuys Publishers, Leiden. 388pp
 Tucker J.K. (2009). Recent cone species database. September 4, 2009 Edition
 Tucker J.K. & Tenorio M.J. (2009) Systematic classification of Recent and fossil conoidean gastropods. Hackenheim: Conchbooks. 296 pp
 Puillandre N., Duda T.F., Meyer C., Olivera B.M. & Bouchet P. (2015). One, four or 100 genera? A new classification of the cone snails. Journal of Molluscan Studies. 81: 1-23

External links
 
 Cone Shells - Knights of the Sea

Gallery

amadis
Gastropods described in 1791
Taxa named by Johann Friedrich Gmelin